John Randolph Tucker High School is a public high school in the West End of Henrico County, Virginia, United States. It is named after lawyer and judge John Randolph Tucker. Its students and faculty often refer to themselves as “Tigers," and locals often refer to the school as "Tucker." The school had approximately 1,600 students and more than 150 faculty members during the 2014-15 school year.
The school attracts students from across Henrico County to participate in its International Baccalaureate Programme, Advance College Academy, and Center for Spanish Language and Global Citizenship (Immersion).
A new J.R. Tucker High School, similar to Glen Allen High School, was built on the location of the former athletic fields and opened for the 2021-22 school year. The old school buildings were demolished and athletic fields built in their place.

Specialty centers
Of the nine comprehensive public high schools in Henrico County, J.R. Tucker is the only one that hosts three specialty centers.

Advance College Academy
The Advance College Academy is designed for students within the program to earn an associate degree in social sciences from J. Sergeant Reynolds Community College (accredited by the Southern Association of Colleges and Schools) in addition to an advanced high school diploma from J. R. Tucker. The students are simultaneously enrolled in both institutions without cost. The program is founded on the standards of the National Alliance of Concurrent Enrollment Partnerships. The 60 college credits earned through the program are earned in the last two years of high school. The students beginning learning the college level material starting their junior year.

International Baccalaureate
International Baccalaureate at J.R. Tucker was first authorized in the 2008-09 school year for the first class of ninth grade IB Middle Years Programme students and, two years later, expanded to include the diploma programs. Tucker's I.B. program is a member of the Mid-Atlantic Regional Conference of IB World Schools. Students at Tucker have to complete Creativity, Action, and Service projects throughout all four years of high school to explore their community and identity, a personal project in the summer after ninth grade to engage in creating a final product of the student's interests, and an extended essay — a university level paper under 4,000 words with a topic of choice — during 11th grade.
The middle years certificate is awarded based on CAS projects in the ninth and 10th grade, meeting certain International Baccalaureate assessment scores in classes, and the personal project score. The International Baccalaureate Diploma requires doing well in CAS projects, International Baccalaureate assessments, and an extended essay.

Center for Spanish Language and Global Citizenship
The Center for Spanish Language and Global Citizenship, known commonly as "immersion," was founded in the 1993-94 school year. Most immersion students have already had one year of study of Spanish. To apply, students should be prepared to take an entrance exam in addition to submitting their transcript and application essay. The program consists of continuing Spanish in immersive classes through high school, taking at least one year of a supplemental language, and opportunities such as studying abroad for credit, gaining entrance with guest speakers, field trips, and cultural events. The students take approximately two-to-three center classes in a seven block schedule, focusing on oral and written Spanish as well as the culture, literature and art of Spanish-speaking countries. Once the program is completed, a special seal is placed onto the graduating student's diploma.

Notable alumni

 Jim Gilmore, governor of Virginia and candidate in the 2008 and 2016 presidential primaries
 Tim Legler, ESPN analyst
 Debbie Matenopoulos, American TV personality
 Mike Milchin, MLB player (Minnesota Twins, Baltimore Orioles)
 Amir Sadollah, professional mixed martial artist, won The Ultimate Fighter 7, UFC welterweight
 Mac Scarce, MLB player (Philadelphia Phillies, Minnesota Twins)
 Abigail Spanberger, U.S. Representative for Virginia's 7th District
 Rick Wagoner, chairman and CEO of General Motors
 Ross Monroe Winter, violinist
 Michael Geier, singer and creator of Puddles Pity Party

References

External links
 

Educational institutions established in 1962
Public high schools in Virginia
Schools in Henrico County, Virginia
1962 establishments in Virginia